The 2018 Grand Prix Izola was the 5th edition of the GP Izola road cycling one day race. It was part of UCI Europe Tour in category 1.2. Due to extreme weather conditions, the race was shortened form 157km to 106.5km.

Teams
Twenty-five teams were invited to take part in the race. These included one UCI Professional Continental team and twenty-four UCI Continental teams.

Result

References

2018 UCI Europe Tour
2018 in Slovenian sport